Mash Brewing Company is a microbrewery in Henley Brook, located within the Swan Valley region of Western Australia.

History 

Mash Brewing opened in April 2006, one of a number of craft breweries operating in the Swan Valley. Owned by Brad Cox, the brewery is located behind the main bar and the open working area allows customers to view the brewing activities. Mash Brewing has a 12-hectolitre brewhouse. The foundation Head Brewer was Dan Turley.

In mid-2008 the company opened Mash Bunbury, a scaled-down version of their Swan Valley operation, including a 100-litre microbrewery that produces seasonal beers for the venue, served on tap together with the full range of Mash beers. 

In November 2011 a new team, headed by brewer Charlie Hodgson, was brought in and set about reinventing the Brewery's beer range. 

The current brewing team are Adrian Godwin and Ivan Juggins, brewing Mash's core range as well as seasonal and limited releases.

Awards 

 2018 AIBA – Silver Medal – Copy Cat
 2018 AIBA – Silver Medal – The Guvnor
 2018 AIBA – Bronze Medal – Little NEIPA

 2017 AIBA - Gold Medal - Three Fiddy (draught)
 2017 AIBA - Silver Medal - Guvnor (draught)
 2017 AIBA - Silver Medal - Indian Ale (draught)
 2017 AIBA - Silver Medal - Freo Doctor (draught)
 2017 AIBA - Bronze Medal - Copy Cat (draught)
 2017 AIBA - Bronze Medal - IRA (draught)
 2017 AIBA - Silver Medal - Invisible (packaged)
 2017 Perth Royal Beer Show – Silver Medal – Copy Cat (draught)
 2017 Perth Royal Beer Show – Silver Medal – Guvnor (draught)
 2017 Perth Royal Beer Show – Silver Medal – Indian Ale (draught)
 2017 Perth Royal Beer Show – Bronze Medal – Freo Doctor (draught)
 2017 Perth Royal Beer Show – Bronze Medal – 3 Fiddy (draught)

 2016 AIBA – Gold Medal – Mash XPA (draught)
 2016 AIBA – Gold Medal – Copy Cat (draught)
 2016 AIBA – Silver Medal – Freo Doctor (draught)
 2016 AIBA – Silver Medal – Sarcasm (draught)
 2016 AIBA – Bronze Medal – Copy Cat (packaged)
 2016 AIBA – Bronze Medal – Grass Cutter (draught)
 2016 Perth Royal Beer Show – Gold Medal – Amber Ale (draught)
 2016 Perth Royal Beer Show – Gold Medal – Indian Pale Ale (draught)
 2016 Perth Royal Beer Show – Gold Medal – American Pale Ale (draught)
 2016 Perth Royal Beer Show – Bronze Medal – Other (draught)
 2016 Perth Royal Beer Show – Bronze Medal – Indian Pale Ale (draught)
 2016 Perth Royal Beer Show – Bronze Medal – Indian Pale Ale (packaged)

 2015 Perth Royal Beer Show – Bronze Medal – Koffee Stout (draught)
 2015 Perth Royal Beer Show – Bronze Medal – Invisible (draught)
 2015 Sydney Royal Beer and Cider Show – Silver Medal – Copy Cat (draught)
 2015 Sydney Royal Beer and Cider Show – Silver Medal – Grass Cutter (draught)
 2015 Sydney Royal Beer and Cider Show – Silver Medal – Copy Cat (packaged)
 2015 Sydney Royal Beer and Cider Show – Silver Medal – Grass Cutter (packaged)
 2015 Perth Royal Beer Show – Silver Medal – Black List (draught)
 2015 Royal Perth Beer Show – Silver Medal – Grass Cutter (draught)
 2015 Perth Royal Beer Show – Gold – Premiers Trophy For Best West Australian Beer at the Show – Copy Cat
 2015 AIBA – Gold Medal – Copy Cat (draught)
 2015 Perth Royal Beer Show – Gold Medal – Copy Cat (draught)
 2015 Perth Royal Beer Show – Sail and Anchor Trophy for Best WA Brewery – Mash Brewing
 2015 AIBA – Bronze Medal – Black List Black Lager (draught)

 2014 Perth Royal Beer Show – Bronze Medal – Challenger IPA (packaged)
 2014 Perth Royal Beer Show – Bronze Medal – Russell (Packaged)
 2014 AIBA – Bronze Medal – Russell (draught)
 2014 Perth Royal Beer Show – Bronze Medal – Mash Pale (Packaged)
 2014 AIBA – Bronze Medal – Rye the Hop Not (draught)
 2014 AIBA – Bronze Medal – Challenger IPA (draught)
 2014 Perth Royal Beer Show – Silver Medal – Copy Cat (packaged)
 2014 Sydney Royal Beer and Cider Show – Silver Medal – Cat No.94 Rye Porter
 2014 Sydney Royal Beer and Cider Show – Silver Medal – Copy Cat AIPA
 2014 AIBA – Gold Medal – Copy Cat AIPA (draught)
 2014 Perth Royal Beer Show – Gold Medal – Copy Cat (draught)
 2014 Perth Royal Beer Show – Gold Medal – Russell (draught)
 2014 Perth Royal Beer Show – Gold Medal – Mash Pale (draught)
 2014 Sydney Royal Beer and Cider Show – Gold Medal – Russell
 2014 AIBA – Bronze Medal – Rye the Hop Not (draught)
 2014 Perth Royal Beer Show – The Beer and Beef Club of Perth Trophy for Best Ale Draught
 2014 Perth Royal Beer Show – Sail and Anchor Trophy for Best WA Brewery – Mash Brewing
 2014 Perth Royal Beer Show – Hopco Trophy for Best Commercial Brewery

 2013 AIBA – Bronze Medal – Mash Contender Black IPA (draught)
 2013 AIBA – Bronze Medal – Koffee Stout (draught)
 2013 AIBA – Bronze Medal – Challenger IPA (draught)
 2013 AIBA – Bronze Medal – Mash Pale (draught)
 2013 Perth Royal Beer Show – Silver Medal – Amber (draught)
 2013 Perth Royal Beer Show – Silver Medal – Challenger IPA (draught)
 2013 Perth Royal Beer Show – Silver Medal – Mash Pale (draught)

 2012 AIBA – Silver Medal – Koffee Stout (draught)
 2012 Perth Royal Beer Show – Bronze Medal – Ale Draught Tank 8 (draught)
 2012 Perth Royal Beer Show – Gold Medal – Koffee Stout (draught)
 2012 AIBA – Gold Medal – Deville (draught)
 2012 AIBA – Bronze Medal – Rye the Hop Not (draught)

 2010 Savour Australia – Finalist – Award for Excellence, Restaurant within a BrewPub
 2010 Perth Royal Beer Show – The Hopco Trophy for Best Stout Draught

 2008 AIBA - Gold Medal - Black Dark Lager (draught)
 2008 AIBA - Silver Medal - Honey Pils (draught)
 2008 AIBA - Silver Medal - Mex Lager (draught)
 2008 AIBA - Silver Medal - Pal (draught)

 2007 Perth Royal Beer Show – Cryer Malt Trophy for Best Ale
 2007 Perth Royal Beer Show – Gold Medal – Pale (draught)
 2007 Perth Royal Beer Show – Silver Medal – Honey Pils (draught)
 2007 Perth Royal Beer Show – Bronze Medal – Belgian Tripel (draught)
 2007 Perth Royal Beer Show – Bronze Medal – Haze (draught)

See also 

 List of breweries in Australia

References

Notes

Bibliography

External links 
 Mash Brewing website

Australian beer brands
Food and drink companies established in 2006
Beer brewing companies based in Western Australia
Australian companies established in 2006